Arly Airport  is a public use airport located near Arli National Park or Arly, Tapoa Province, Burkina Faso. While the runway outline is clearly visible, it appears overgrown with vegetation and may be unusable. However, the airfield is still listed in the official ASECNA Aeronautical Information Publication for Burkina Faso and has an official IATA 3-letter code, though its 4-letter code does not appear to be recognised by ICAO.

See also
List of airports in Burkina Faso

References

External links 
ASECNA AIP for Burkina Faso

Airports in Burkina Faso
Tapoa Province